London 2 North East is an English level 7 Rugby Union League.  When this division began in 1987 it was known as London 3 North East, changing to its current name ahead of the 2009–10 season. It is made up of teams predominantly from north east London, Cambridgeshire, Suffolk, Norfolk and Essex. The twelve teams play home and away matches from September through to April.  Each year all clubs in the division also take part in the RFU Intermediate Cup - a level 7 national competition.

Promoted teams move up to London 1 North with the league champions going up automatically and the runners up entering a promotion playoff against the league runners up from London 2 North West. Relegated teams from Cambridgeshire, Suffolk or Norfolk drop to London 3 Eastern Counties, while Essex and London teams drop to London 3 Essex.

Teams for 2021–22

The teams competing in 2021-22 achieved their places in the league based on performances in 2019–20, the 'previous season' column in the table below refers to that season not 2020–21.

''

Season 2020–21

On 30 October the RFU announced  that a decision had been taken to cancel Adult Competitive Leagues (National League 1 and below) for the 2020/21 season meaning London 2 North East was not contested.

Teams for 2019–20

Teams for 2018–19

Teams for 2017–18

Teams for 2016-17
Campion
Cantabrigian
Diss
Epping Upper Clapton (promoted from London 3 North East)
Holt 
Ipswich
Norwich
Old Cooperians (promoted from London 3 North East)
Rochford Hundred
Romford & Gidea Park
South Woodham Ferrers
Woodford (transferred from London 2 North West)

Teams for 2015-16
Basildon
Campion 
Cantabrigian (promoted from London 3 North East)
Diss
Holt
Ipswich (relegated from London 1 North)
Norwich
Rochford Hundred
Romford & Gidea Park (relegated from London 1 North)
Saffron Walden
South Woodham Ferrers
Sudbury (promoted from London 3 North East)

Teams for 2014-15
Basildon
Braintree
Campion (promoted from London 3 North East)
Chelmsford
Diss (relegated from London 1 North)
Enfield Ignatians
Holt
Norwich
Old Cooperians (promoted from London 3 North East)
Rochford Hundred
Saffron Walden
South Woodham Ferrers

Teams for 2013-14
Basildon (relegated from London 1 North)
Braintree
Chelmsford	
Enfield Ignatians
Holt
Ipswich
Lowestoft & Yarmouth
Norwich (promoted from London 3 North East)
Rochford Hundred
Saffron Walden
South Woodham Ferrers
Stowmarket

Teams for 2012-13
Braintree
Chelmsford
Enfield Ignatians
Holt
Ipswich
Lowestoft & Yarmouth
North Walsham
Old Streetonians
Saffron Walden
Stevenage Town
Stowmarket
Woodford

Teams for 2009-2010
Beccles
Braintree
Canvey Island
Chelmsford
Enfield Ignatians
Harlow
Ipswich
Old Streetonians
Rochford Hundred
Romford & Gidea Park
Saffron Walden
Sudbury

Original teams

When league rugby began in 1987 this division (known as London 3 North East) contained the following teams:

Barking
Brentwood
Bury St Edmunds
Chingford
Colchester
Eton Manor
Ipswich YMCA
Old Cantabrigian
Old Westcliffians
Saffron Walden

London 2 North East Honours

London 3 North East (1987–1993)

Originally known as London 3 North East, this division was a tier 7 league with promotion up to London 2 North and relegation down to Eastern Counties 1.

London 3 North East (1993–1996)

At the end of the 1992–93 season, the top six teams from London 1 and the top six from South West 1 were combined to create National 5 South.  This meant that London 3 North East dropped from a tier 7 league to a tier 8 league for the years that National 5 South was active.  Promotion and relegation continued to London 2 North and Eastern Counties 1 respectively.

London 3 North East (1996–2000)

The cancellation of National 5 South at the end of the 1995–96 season meant that London 3 North East reverted to being a tier 7 league.  Promotion and relegation continued to London 2 North and Eastern Counties 1 respectively.

London 3 North East (2000–2009)

London 3 North East continued to be a tier 7 league with promotion up to London 2 North.  However, the introduction of London 4 North East ahead of the 2000–01 season meant that clubs were now relegated into this new division instead of into Eastern Counties 1.

London 2 North East (2009–2017)

Nationwide league restructuring by the RFU ahead of the 2009–10 season saw London 3 North East renamed as London 2 North East.  It remained at level 7 with promotion to London 1 North (formerly London 2 North) and relegation to London 3 North East (formerly London 4 North East).

London 2 North East (2017–present)

Further restructuring ahead of the 2017–18 season, which included the cancellation of London 3 North East and introduction of London 3 Eastern Counties or London 3 Essex, meant that relegation was now to either of these new leagues.  Overwise, London 2 North East was unchanged, remaining as a tier 7 division with promotion continuing to London 1 North.

Promotion play-offs
Since the 2000–01 season there has been a play-off between the runners-up of London 2 North East and London 2 North West for the third and final promotion place to London 1 North. The team with the superior league record has home advantage in the tie.  At the end of the 2018–10 season the London 2 North East and London 2 North West teams are tied on nine wins apiece, and the home team has won promotion on fourteen occasions compared to the away teams five.

Number of league titles

Rochford Hundred (4)
Romford & Gidea Park (3)
Chingford (2)
Diss (2)
Chelmsford (2)
Eton Manor (2)
Ipswich (2)
Shelford (2)
Barking (1)
Brentwood (1)
Bury St Edmunds (1)
Cambridge (1)
Colchester (1)
Harlow (1)
Lowestoft & Yarmouth (1)
North Walsham (1)
Norwich (1)
Saffron Walden (1)
Southend (1)
Thurrock (1)
Westcliff (1)
Woodford (1)

Notes

See also
London & SE Division RFU
Eastern Counties RFU
Essex RFU
English rugby union system
Rugby union in England

References

External links
London 2 North East results at the Rugby Football Union

7
3